was a member and chairman of the Social Democratic Party of Japan (SDP). He was the chairman from January 1993 to September 1993.

In late 1994, he formed his own faction in the SDP called the New Democratic Union. In early 1995, he then formed a new party called Democratic League—Democratic New Party Club. But, after the Kobe earthquake and the Tokyo subway attack in 1995, the party disbanded.

His son, Ikuo Yamahana is a current member of the House of Representatives.

References

1936 births
1999 deaths
Social Democratic Party (Japan) politicians